The Bold Ruckus Stakes is a Thoroughbred horse race run annually in mid June at Woodbine Racetrack in Toronto, Ontario, Canada. Inaugurated in 1996 it is an Ontario Sire Stakes, it is a restricted race for three-year-olds and up is contested over a distance of 6 furlongs on turf and currently carries a purse of $125,000.

The race was named to honor Canadian Horse Racing Hall of Fame inductee, Bold Ruckus.

Records
Speed  record: 
 1:08.65 - Me the Sea and G T  (2009)

Most wins by an owner:
 No owner has won this race more than once.

Most wins by a jockey:
 3 - Ray Sabourin (1997, 2002, 2005)

Most wins by a trainer:
 No trainer has won this race more than once.

Winners

References
 The 2008 Bold Ruckus Stakes at Woodbine Entertainment

Ontario Sire Stakes
Ungraded stakes races in Canada
Flat horse races for three-year-olds
Recurring sporting events established in 1997
Woodbine Racetrack